White House United Methodist Church, also known as the White Meeting House and White Church, is a historic Methodist church located near Orangeburg in Orangeburg County, South Carolina.  It was built about 1850, and is a one-story, rectangular frame meeting house style building.  It houses the oldest Methodist congregation in Orangeburg County, dating back to the late 1780s. Francis Asbury visited the congregation in 1801 and 1803.

It was added to the National Register of Historic Places in 1974.

References

United Methodist churches in South Carolina
Churches on the National Register of Historic Places in South Carolina
Churches completed in 1850
19th-century Methodist church buildings in the United States
Churches in Orangeburg County, South Carolina
National Register of Historic Places in Orangeburg County, South Carolina